3C 321 is a system of two galaxies rotating around each other. They are notable for showing the first observed galaxy smiting another galaxy with a blast of energy, which is theorized to be from a supermassive black hole at the center of the former galaxy.

The larger galaxy, dubbed the "Death Star Galaxy" by NASA astronomers, has an energetic jet directed towards its companion. The discovery was announced by NASA on 18 December 2007. Observation of the enormous jet was possible due to the combined efforts of both space and ground-based telescopes.

Tools included NASA's Chandra X-ray Observatory, Hubble Space Telescope, Spitzer Space Telescope, the Very Large Array, and the Multi-Element Radio Linked Interferometer Network.

References

Further reading

External links
 "Black Hole Fires at Neighboring Galaxy" at Harvard University's Chandra Photo Album
 Source page for 3C321 at Extragalactic.info
 An Atlas of DRAGNs: 3C 321 by the Jodrell Bank Centre for Astrophysics

Serpens (constellation)
Interacting galaxies
321
55317
Active galaxies
Astronomical objects discovered in 2007